Darlington Township is a township in Harvey County, Kansas, United States.  As of the 2000 census, its population was 601.

Geography
The streams of East Fork Jester Creek and West Fork Jester Creek run through this township.

References

Further reading

External links
 Harvey County Website
 City-Data.com
 Harvey County Maps: Current, Historic, KDOT

Townships in Harvey County, Kansas
Townships in Kansas